Mama's Pride is the debut studio album by American rock band Mama's Pride. It was released on January 1, 1975, by Atco Records, a division of Atlantic Records at the time, now a division of Warner Brothers. The album was produced by Arif Mardin. Although a commercial failure, the album spawned the band's signature song "Blue Mist", which gained popularity amongst the locals and radio stations of St. Louis, the band's home city.

Track listing

Personnel 
Ref:

Mama's Pride 

 Danny Liston – vocals, guitar
 Pat Liston – vocals, guitar, slide guitar, organ
 Max Baker – guitar, 12-string acoustic guitar, backing vocals
 Frank Gagliano – keyboards
 Kevin Saunders – drums, percussion, backing vocals
 Joe Turek – bass, backing vocals

Production 

 Arif Mardin – producer
 Karl Richardson – engineer
 Gerry Block, Steve Gursky – assistant engineer
 Lew Hahn – re-mixing
 Walden And Brusco, Inc. – management
 Frank Moscati – photography
 Bob Defrin – art direction

References 

1975 debut albums